Sex Tips from Rock Stars: In Their Own Words is a book by Paul Miles that quotes answers from 23 rock stars to many questions on a broad range of sexual topics.  The editors claim that the book is the world's first confessional by rock stars on their sexual adventures.

As the rock stars share their sexual instincts, urges and experiences, it produces a book that is part self-help sex manual, part rock music biography, part humour, and part erotica.

 Acey Slade - Murderdolls, Dope
 Adde - Hardcore Superstar
 Allison Robertson - The Donnas
 Andrew W.K.
 Blasko - Ozzy Osbourne, Rob Zombie
 Brent Muscat - Faster Pussycat
 Bruce Kulick - Kiss
 Chip Z'Nuff - Enuff Z'Nuff
 Courtney Taylor-Taylor - The Dandy Warhols
 Danko Jones
 Doug Robb - Hoobastank
 Evan Seinfeld - Biohazard
 Ginger - The Wildhearts
 Handsome Dick Manitoba - The Dictators, MC5
 James Kottak - Scorpions, Kingdom Come
 Jesse Hughes - Eagles of Death Metal
 Jimmy Ashhurst - Buckcherry
 Joel O'Keeffe - Airbourne
 Lemmy - Motörhead
 Nicke Borg - Backyard Babies
 Rob Patterson - Korn, Otep
 Toby Rand - Juke Kartel
 Vazquez - Damone

The sexual topics covered in the book comprise the following chapters:

 Beauty & Attraction
 Clothing & Lingerie
 Copulation
 Daring Locations
 Dating & Courtship
 Divorce
 Drugs & Alcohol (& Impotence)
 Enlargements & Extensions
 Fetishes & Fantasies
 Foreplay & Arousal
 Groupies
 Hygiene & Grooming
 Kissing & Caressing
 Knitting & Crocheting
 Marriage
 Masturbation (Autoeroticism)
 Money for Sex
 One Night Stands
 Oral Sex
 Romancing & Winning Hearts
 Safe Sex (Contraceptives & STDs)
 Sexual Preference (Hetero & Homo)
 Technique Improvements
 Toys & Tools
 Virginity

After contributing to the best-selling rock autobiography The Dirt, Paul Miles authored a range of paperback music books on the rock band: Mötley Crüe. Sex Tips from Rock Stars is his first book with other musicians.

The book was released worldwide by Omnibus Press, in July 2010 in Europe, and October 2010 in North America and Australia.

References

External links
 Official Sex Tips from Rock Stars website http://www.sextipsfromrockstars.com
 Listing on Amazon UK https://www.amazon.co.uk/Sex-Tips-Rock-Stars-Their/dp/1849384045
Sex Tips from Rock Stars
Biographies about musicians
Non-fiction books about sexuality